Caerostris, sometimes called bark spiders, is a genus of orb-weaver spiders first described by Tamerlan Thorell in 1868. Most species are found in south eastern Africa and neighboring Madagascar.

Taxonomy
The genus Caerostris was erected in 1868 by Tamerlan Thorell with the type species being Epeira mitralis Vinson, 1863, which Thorell transferred to Caerostris mitralis. Up to 2009, only 11 species had been described. A further species, C. darwini, was described in 2010, and six more species in 2015. Two of the "species", C. sexcuspidata and C. sumatrana, will probably need to be divided further to produce genetically uniform species.

A molecular phylogenetic study of 12 of the species of Caerostris produced the phylogenetic tree shown below, showing that the African and Madagascan species form a monophyletic group.

Species
 it contains eighteen species:
Caerostris almae Gregorič, 2015 – Madagascar
Caerostris bojani Gregorič, 2015 – Madagascar
Caerostris corticosa Pocock, 1902 – South Africa
Caerostris cowani Butler, 1882 – Madagascar
Caerostris darwini Kuntner & Agnarsson, 2010 – Madagascar
Caerostris ecclesiigera Butler, 1882 – Madagascar
Caerostris extrusa Butler, 1882 – Madagascar
Caerostris hirsuta (Simon, 1895) – Madagascar
Caerostris indica Strand, 1915 – Myanmar
Caerostris linnaeus Gregorič, 2015 – Mozambique
Caerostris mayottensis Grasshoff, 1984 – Comoros, Mayotte
Caerostris mitralis (Vinson, 1863) – Central Africa, Madagascar
Caerostris pero Gregorič, 2015 – Madagascar
Caerostris sexcuspidata (Fabricius, 1793) – Africa, Madagascar, Comoros, Seychelles (Aldabra)
Caerostris sumatrana Strand, 1915 – India to China, Borneo
Caerostris tinamaze Gregorič, 2015 – South Africa
Caerostris vicina (Blackwall, 1866) – Central, Southern Africa
Caerostris wallacei Gregorič, Blackledge, Agnarsson & Kuntner, 2015 – Madagascar

References

 
Spiders of Africa
Spiders of Asia
Araneomorphae genera
Taxa named by Tamerlan Thorell